Slavko Aleksić (born 1 September 1956) is a Bosnian Serb Chetnik commander (vojvoda) who commanded the New Sarajevo Chetnik Detachment of the Army of Republika Srpska during the Bosnian War.

Biography 
Aleksić was born in 1956 in Bogdašići, near the Herzegovinian town of Bileća. He spent most of his life in Sarajevo, where he studied law and later worked in a post office.

He was one of the founders of the Chetnik movement in Sarajevo in 1990. Since 1990, Aleksić has been a member of the Serbian Radical Party led by Vojislav Šešelj. After the Sarajevo wedding attack on 1 March 1992 and the start of the Bosnian War, he became the commander of the New Sarajevo Chetnik Detachment of the Army of Republika Srpska based in Grbavica. He was appointed vojvoda by Vojislav Šeselj on 13 May 1993 and by Momčilo Đujić on 27 January 1999. He distinguished himself in the battles around Grbavica, and was wounded three times. Among other things, with the New Sarajevo Chetnik Detachment, he held Serb positions at the Jewish cemetery, where the fiercest fighting took place at the demarcation line between Serb Sarajevo and Sarajevo and between the Army of Republika Srpska and Army of the Republic of Bosnia and Herzegovina. After the Operation Deliberate Force in 1995, and after the signing of the Dayton Agreement, in March 1996, he led the withdrawal of the Army of Republika Srpska and Serbs from Grbavica.

After the war he settled in the woods around Bileća and is an active member of the Ravna Gora Movement of Republika Srpska.

References 

1956 births
People from Bileća
Serbs of Bosnia and Herzegovina
Army of Republika Srpska soldiers
Living people